Time in Bahrain is given by Arabia Standard Time (AST) (UTC+03:00). Bahrain does not currently observe daylight saving time.

References